The Europe Zone was the unique zone within Group 3 of the regional Davis Cup competition in 2022. The zone's competition was held in round robin format in Ulcinj, Montenegro, from 22 to 25 June 2022.

Participating nations

Draw
Date: 22–25 June 2022

Location: Tennis Club Bellevue, Ulcinj, Montenegro (clay)

Format: Round-robin basis. Two pools of four teams and nations will play each team once in their group. The two group winners will automatically earn promotion to the World Group II play-offs in 2022.

The two second-placed teams will fight for the third remaining promotion spot. The four teams finishing in third and last place will fight to avoid relegation to Europe Group IV.

Seeding

 1Davis Cup Rankings as of 7 March 2022

Round Robin

Pool A

Pool B

Standings are determined by: 1. number of wins; 2. number of matches; 3. in two-team ties, head-to-head records; 4. in three-team ties, (a) percentage of sets won (head-to-head records if two teams remain tied), then (b) percentage of games won (head-to-head records if two teams remain tied), then (c) Davis Cup rankings.

Playoffs

 ,  and  qualify for the 2023 Davis Cup World Group II Play-offs

Round Robin

Pool A

Cyprus vs. Liechtenstein

Georgia vs. Armenia

Cyprus vs. Armenia

Georgia vs. Liechtenstein

Cyprus vs. Georgia

Armenia vs. Liechtenstein

Pool B

Montenegro vs. Moldova

Luxembourg vs. North Macedonia

Montenegro vs. North Macedonia

Luxembourg vs. Moldova

Montenegro vs. Luxembourg

North Macedonia vs. Moldova

Play-offs

Promotional play-offs

Georgia vs. Luxembourg

Cyprus vs. Moldova

Relegation play-offs

Armenia vs. Montenegro

Liechtenstein vs. North Macedonia

Final placements 

 ,  and  qualify for the 2023 Davis Cup World Group II Play-offs

References

External links
Official Website

Davis Cup Europe/Africa Zone
Europe Zone